The Conservative government of the United Kingdom that began in 1957 and ended in 1964 consisted of three ministries: the first Macmillan ministry, second Macmillan ministry, and then the Douglas-Home ministry. They were respectively led by Harold Macmillan and Sir Alec Douglas-Home, who were appointed by Queen Elizabeth II.


History

Formation of the first Macmillan ministry
Sir Anthony Eden resigned from his positions of Leader of the Conservative Party and Prime Minister of the United Kingdom on 10 January 1957. This was mainly a consequence of the Suez Crisis fiasco of the previous autumn, but was also owing to his increasingly failing health. Harold Macmillan, formerly Foreign Secretary and Chancellor of the Exchequer, was chosen over Rab Butler as the new party leader and consequently as Prime Minister.

Harold Macmillan tried to placate Butler, who had stood against Macmillan as leader, by appointing him to the senior position of Home Secretary. Peter Thorneycroft became Chancellor of the Exchequer, but caused embarrassment for Macmillan when he resigned only a year later. He was replaced by Derick Heathcoat Amory, previously Minister of Agriculture, Fisheries and Food. Selwyn Lloyd was retained as Foreign Secretary, a post he held until 1960, when he succeeded Heathcoat Amory as Chancellor. Ernest Marples became Minister for Transport and the Earl of Home was promoted to Leader of the House of Lords and also continued as Secretary of State for Commonwealth Affairs, before replacing Lloyd as Foreign Secretary in 1960. Lord Kilmuir and Alan Lennox-Boyd retained their offices of Lord Chancellor and Secretary of State for the Colonies respectively, while Lord Hailsham became a member of the cabinet for the first time as Minister of Education. Future Chancellor Iain Macleod was appointed Minister of Labour and National Service and succeeded Lennox-Boyd as Secretary of State for the Colonies in 1961.

1959 general election and second Macmillan ministry
The Conservatives comfortably won the 1959 general election, increasing their majority in the House of Commons, following a campaign slogan "Life's better with the Conservatives". This centred on the consistently low unemployment, strong economy and rising standard of living that much of the British population was enjoying in the late 1950s.

However, a series of economic measures in the early 1960s caused the popularity of the Conservative Party to decline. Macmillan tried to remedy this by a major cabinet reshuffle in July 1962. Seven cabinet members were sacked in what became nicknamed the "Night of the Long Knives". Notably, the emerging Reginald Maudling replaced Selwyn Lloyd as Chancellor, and Lord Kilmuir was replaced as Lord Chancellor by Lord Dilhorne, while Peter Thorneycroft returned to the cabinet as Minister of Defence. Rab Butler was also promoted to the office of First Secretary of State. The reshuffle was controversial within the Conservative Party, and was seen as a betrayal by many. Macmillan's credibility was also affected by the 1963 Profumo affair; he was now in his 69th year, and had until after his 70th birthday to call the next general election. The election of Harold Wilson as Labour Party leader early in the year, following the sudden death of Hugh Gaitskell, was well received by voters, with opinion polls showing the Labour Party ascendant.

However, it was still considered a surprise when Macmillan resigned in October 1963.

Douglas-Home becomes Prime Minister
Macmillan's resignation saw a three-way tussle for the party leadership and premiership. Given that it was not considered appropriate for a Prime Minister to be a member of the House of Lords, the Earl of Home and Lord Hailsham both disclaimed their peerages under the Peerage Act 1963, and became known respectively as Sir Alec Douglas-Home and Quintin Hogg. Rab Butler was also in the running for the post, but Douglas-Home was finally chosen to succeed Macmillan. This was seen as controversial, for it was alleged that Macmillan had pulled strings and used the party's grandees, nicknamed "The Magic Circle", to ensure that Butler was once again overlooked.

In the Douglas-Home ministry, Rab Butler became Foreign Secretary, and Henry Brooke replaced Butler as Home Secretary. Reginald Maudling continued as Chancellor, while Quintin Hogg remained as Lord President of the Council and Minister for Sports. He could not continue as Leader of the House of Lords, having ceased to be a member of it, but was made Minister for Education in April 1964. Selwyn Lloyd also returned to the government after a one-year absence, as Leader of the House of Commons. Douglas-Home's government was defeated in the October 1964 general election. He remained party leader until July 1965.

The 1957–1964 Conservative government saw several emerging figures who would later attain high office. Future Prime Minister Edward Heath became a member of the cabinet for the first time as Minister of Labour and National Service in 1959, while another future Prime Minister, Margaret Thatcher, held her first government post in 1961 as Parliamentary Secretary to the Ministry of Pensions. The government also included future Chancellor Anthony Barber, future Home Secretary and Deputy Prime Minister William Whitelaw and future Secretary of State for Education and Science Sir Keith Joseph. Other notable government members included Enoch Powell, Lord Carrington, David Ormsby-Gore, John Profumo, Christopher Soames, Bill Deedes, Airey Neave and the Marquess of Salisbury.

Cabinets

First Macmillan ministry

January 1957 – October 1959
 Harold Macmillan: Prime Minister
 The Viscount Kilmuir: Lord High Chancellor of Great Britain
 The Marquess of Salisbury: Leader of the House of Lords and Lord President of the Council
 Rab Butler: Leader of the House of Commons and Lord Keeper of the Privy Seal and Secretary of State for the Home Department
 Peter Thorneycroft: Chancellor of the Exchequer
 Selwyn Lloyd: Secretary of State for Foreign Affairs
 Alan Lennox-Boyd: Secretary of State for the Colonies
 The Earl of Home: Secretary of State for Commonwealth Relations
 Sir David Eccles: President of the Board of Trade
 Charles Hill: Chancellor of the Duchy of Lancaster
 The Viscount Hailsham: Minister of Education
 John Scott Maclay: Secretary of State for Scotland
 Derick Heathcoat Amory: Minister of Agriculture
 Iain Macleod: Minister of Labour and National Service
 Harold Arthur Watkinson: Minister of Transport and Civil Aviation
 Duncan Edwin Sandys: Minister of Defence
 The Lord Mills: Minister of Power
 Henry Brooke: Minister of Housing and Local Government and Welsh Affairs

Changes
 March 1957 – Earl of Home succeeds Marquess of Salisbury as Lord President, remaining also Commonwealth Relations Secretary.
 September 1957 – Viscount Hailsham succeeds Earl of Home as Lord President, Home remaining Commonwealth Relations Secretary. Geoffrey Lloyd succeeds Hailsham as Minister of Education. The Paymaster-General, Reginald Maudling, enters the Cabinet.
 January 1958 – Derick Heathcoat Amory succeeds Peter Thorneycroft as Chancellor of the Exchequer. John Hare succeeds Amory as Minister of Agriculture.

Second Macmillan ministry

October 1959 – July 1960
 Harold Macmillan: Prime Minister
 The Viscount Kilmuir: Lord High Chancellor of Great Britain
 The Earl of Home: Lord President of the Council and Secretary of State for Commonwealth Relations
 The Viscount Hailsham: Lord Keeper of the Privy Seal and Minister of Science
 Derick Heathcoat Amory: Chancellor of the Exchequer
 Rab Butler: Secretary of State for the Home Department
 Selwyn Lloyd: Secretary of State for Foreign Affairs
 Iain Macleod: Secretary of State for the Colonies
 Reginald Maudling: President of the Board of Trade
 Charles Hill: Chancellor of the Duchy of Lancaster
 Sir David Eccles: Minister of Education
 The Lord Mills: Paymaster-General
 Ernest Marples: Minister of Transport
 Duncan Edwin Sandys: Minister of Aviation
 Harold Arthur Watkinson: Minister of Defence
 John Scott Maclay: Secretary of State for Scotland
 Edward Heath: Minister of Labour and National Service
 John Hare: Minister of Agriculture
 Henry Brooke: Minister of Housing and Local Government and Welsh Affairs

July 1960 – October 1961
 Harold Macmillan: Prime Minister
 The Viscount Kilmuir: Lord High Chancellor of Great Britain
 The Viscount Hailsham: Lord President of the Council and Minister of Science
 Selwyn Lloyd: Chancellor of the Exchequer
 The Earl of Home: Secretary of State for Foreign Affairs
 Edward Heath: Lord Keeper of the Privy Seal
 Rab Butler: Secretary of State for the Home Department
 Iain Macleod: Secretary of State for the Colonies
 Duncan Edwin Sandys: Secretary of State for Commonwealth Relations
 Reginald Maudling: President of the Board of Trade
 Charles Hill: Chancellor of the Duchy of Lancaster
 Sir David Eccles: Minister of Education
 The Lord Mills: Paymaster-General
 Ernest Marples: Minister of Transport
 Peter Thorneycroft: Minister of Aviation
 Harold Arthur Watkinson: Minister of Defence
 John Scott Maclay: Secretary of State for Scotland
 John Hare: Minister of Labour
 Christopher Soames: Minister of Agriculture
 Henry Brooke: Minister of Housing and Local Government and Welsh Affairs

October 1961 – July 1962
 Harold Macmillan: Prime Minister
 The Viscount Kilmuir: Lord High Chancellor of Great Britain
 The Viscount Hailsham: Lord President of the Council and Minister of Science
 Selwyn Lloyd: Chancellor of the Exchequer
 The Earl of Home: Secretary of State for Foreign Affairs
 Edward Heath: Lord Keeper of the Privy Seal
 Rab Butler: Secretary of State for the Home Department
 Reginald Maudling: Secretary of State for the Colonies
 Duncan Edwin Sandys: Secretary of State for Commonwealth Relations
 Frederick Erroll: President of the Board of Trade
 Iain Macleod: Chancellor of the Duchy of Lancaster
 Sir David Eccles: Minister of Education
 Henry Brooke: Chief Secretary to the Treasury and Paymaster-General
 Ernest Marples: Minister of Transport
 Peter Thorneycroft: Minister of Aviation
 Harold Arthur Watkinson: Minister of Defence
 John Scott Maclay: Secretary of State for Scotland
 John Hare: Minister of Labour
 Christopher Soames: Minister of Agriculture
 Charles Hill: Minister of Housing and Local Government and Welsh Affairs
 The Lord Mills: Minister without Portfolio

July 1962 – October 1963
In a radical reshuffle dubbed "The Night of the Long Knives", Macmillan sacked a third of his Cabinet and instituted many other changes.
 Harold Macmillan: Prime Minister
 Rab Butler: Deputy Prime Minister and First Secretary of State
 The Viscount Dilhorne: Lord High Chancellor of Great Britain
 The Viscount Hailsham: Lord President of the Council and Minister of Science
 Henry Brooke: Secretary of State for the Home Department
 The Earl of Home: Secretary of State for Foreign Affairs
 Edward Heath: Lord Keeper of the Privy Seal
 Reginald Maudling: Chancellor of the Exchequer
 Duncan Edwin Sandys: Secretary of State for the Colonies and Secretary of State for Commonwealth Relations
 Frederick Erroll: President of the Board of Trade
 Iain Macleod: Chancellor of the Duchy of Lancaster
 Sir Edward Boyle: Minister of Education
 John Boyd-Carpenter: Chief Secretary to the Treasury and Paymaster-General
 Ernest Marples: Minister of Transport
 Julian Amery: Minister of Aviation
 Peter Thorneycroft: Minister of Defence
 Michael Noble: Secretary of State for Scotland
 John Hare: Minister of Labour
 Christopher Soames: Minister of Agriculture
 Sir Keith Joseph: Minister of Housing and Local Government and Welsh Affairs
 Enoch Powell: Minister of Health
 Bill Deedes: Minister without Portfolio

Douglas-Home ministry

October 1963 – October 1964
Sir Alec Douglas-Home: Prime Minister and First Lord of the Treasury
The Viscount Dilhorne: Lord High Chancellor of Great Britain
Quintin Hogg: Lord President of the Council and Minister of Science
Selwyn Lloyd: Leader of the House of Commons and Lord Keeper of the Privy Seal 
Reginald Maudling: Chancellor of the Exchequer
Rab Butler: Secretary of State for Foreign Affairs
Henry Brooke: Secretary of State for the Home Department
Sir Keith Joseph: Minister of Housing and Local Government
Peter Thorneycroft: Minister of Defence
Julian Amery: Minister of Aviation
Ernest Marples: Minister of Transport
Frederick Erroll: Minister of Power
Edward Heath: Secretary of State for Industry, Trade, and Regional Development and President of the Board of Trade
Duncan Sandys: Secretary of State for the Colonies and Secretary of State for Commonwealth Relations
Sir Edward Boyle: Minister of Education
Anthony Barber: Minister of Health
John Boyd-Carpenter: Chief Secretary to the Treasury and Paymaster-General
Joseph Godber: Minister of Labour
Geoffrey Rippon: Minister of Public Works
Christopher Soames: Minister of Agriculture, Fisheries and Food
Michael Noble: Secretary of State for Scotland
The Viscount Blakenham: Chancellor of the Duchy of Lancaster
William Deedes: Minister without Portfolio
The Lord Carrington:  Leader of the House of Lords and Minister without Portfolio

Changes
April 1964 – Quintin Hogg became Secretary of State for Education and Science. Peter Thorneycroft's position became Secretary of State for Defence. Sir Edward Boyle left the cabinet

List of ministers
Members of the Cabinet are in bold face.

References

1950s in the United Kingdom
1957 establishments in the United Kingdom
1960s in the United Kingdom
1964 disestablishments in the United Kingdom
1957-1964
Cabinets disestablished in 1964
Cabinets established in 1957
Government
 
Ministries of Elizabeth II